German submarine U-181 was a Type IXD2 U-boat of Germany's Kriegsmarine during World War II. The submarine was laid down on 15 March 1941 at the DeSchiMAG AG Weser yard at Bremen as yard number 1021. She was launched on 30 December 1941 and commissioned on 9 May 1942 under the command of Kapitänleutnant Wolfgang Lüth. After training with the 4th U-boat Flotilla at Stettin, U-181 was attached to the 10th flotilla for front-line service on 1 October 1942, then transferred to the 12th flotilla on 1 November.

Design
German Type IXD2 submarines were considerably larger than the original Type IXs. U-181 had a displacement of  when at the surface and  while submerged. She had two shafts and two  propellers.

U-181 was fitted with six  torpedo tubes (four fitted at the bow and two at the stern), 24 torpedoes, one  SK C/32 naval gun, 150 rounds, and a  SK C/30 with 2575 rounds as well as two  C/30 anti-aircraft guns with 8100 rounds. The boat had a complement of fifty-five.

Operational history
Under Lüth's command she sailed on two long combat patrols in late 1942 and 1943, patrolling the waters off South Africa and Mozambique and sinking 22 ships for a total of 103,712 GRT, earning him a promotion to Korvettenkapitän and the Knight's Cross of the Iron Cross with Oak Leaves, Swords and Diamonds. He went on to command the 22nd U-boat Flotilla.

On 1 November 1943 under the command of Fregattenkapitän Kurt Freiwald and part of the 12th U-boat Flotilla. U-181 sailed from her base in Bordeaux, France to Penang, Malaya (now Malaysia) in mid–1944, sinking four ships totalling 24,869 GRT. They carried a Bachstelze and a Naxos radar detector on this trip. On 1 October 1944 the U-boat was transferred to the 33rd U-boat Flotilla. She carried out only one additional patrol in the Indian Ocean, in 1944–1945, on their journey home with 130 tons of tin, 20 tons of molybdenum, 80-100 tons of raw rubber, and the latest radar-detection equipment FUMB26 TUNIS. They ended up sinking a single ship of 10,198 GRT. Because of their cargo, they only had room for two torpedoes, which they used in this sinking. The trip home was aborted when the main bearings started to wear out, prompting a return to Batavia on 6 January 1945, but transferring their fuel to  near the Cocos Islands on the way.

On the 12th, they were ordered to Penang, but only made it as far as Singapore. There they worked on repairing the engines and fitting a Schnorchel, before attempting a renewed trip home starting on 10 May.

Wolfpacks
U-181 took part in one wolfpack from 27 to 30 March 1943.

Fate
On 6 May, Otto Giese dropped the two code-key machines into the Singapore harbor, and later that day, the boat was "taken" by the Japanese Captain Marujama. Admiral Paul Wenneker sent the message on 8 May, that Lubeck was in place, "an early agreement between Germany and Japan, if one nation lost and the other continued fighting, the former would render its war material to the latter." The crew was taken to Batu Pahat.

After Germany's surrender in May 1945 the U-boat was taken over by Japan at Singapore and commissioned as I-501 on 15 July 1945.

Summary of raiding history

References

Bibliography

External links
 Submarine I-501: Tabular Record of Movement
 

German Type IX submarines
World War II submarines of Germany
World War II submarines of Japan
Foreign submarines of the Imperial Japanese Navy
U-boats commissioned in 1942
Indian Ocean U-Boats
1941 ships
U-boats sunk by British warships
U-boats scuttled in 1946
Maritime incidents in 1946
Ships built in Bremen (state)
Shipwrecks in the Strait of Malacca